Never Die Young is the twelfth studio album by singer-songwriter James Taylor released in 1988, three years after his previous effort, That's Why I'm Here. The album reached No. 25 on the Billboard 200 and eventually was certified Platinum by the RIAA. It features the title track, which peaked at No. 80 on the Billboard Hot 100, becoming the only charting single from the album.

Cash Box said of the title track that the "lyrics are, as always, a dazzling string of pearls that mesmerize your heart while the musical feel covers you like a warm breeze."  Cash Box said of "Baby Boom Baby" that "Taylor again defines the agonizingly beautiful attainment of everything and really nothing at all, life's passage and passing."  Cash Box said of "Sweet Potato Pie" that it contains "smooth yet deceptively deep material."

Track listing
All songs were written by James Taylor, except where noted.
"Never Die Young" – 4:24
"T-Bone" (Bill Payne, Taylor) – 3:47
"Baby Boom Baby" (Taylor, Zachary Wiesner) – 4:59
"Runaway Boy" – 4:18
"Valentine's Day" – 2:35
"Sun on the Moon" – 4:09
"Sweet Potato Pie" – 3:30
"Home by Another Way" (Timothy Mayer, Taylor) – 3:50
"Letter in the Mail" – 4:41
"First of May" – 4:01

Personnel 
 James Taylor – lead vocals, guitars
 Don Grolnick – keyboards
 Clifford Carter – synthesizer programming 
 Robbie Kilgore – synthesizer programming 
 Bill Payne – synthesizers (2, 4)
 Bob Mann – guitars
 Jeff Mironov – additional guitars (2, 6)
 Dan Dugmore – banjo, pedal steel guitar
 Leland Sklar – bass guitar (1-4, 6-10)
 Jay Leonhart – acoustic bass (5)
 Carlos Vega – drums, percussion
  "Cafe" Edison A. da Silva – percussion (10)
 Michael Brecker – tenor saxophone (2, 3)
 Mark O'Connor – violin (4, 5)
 Greg "Fingers" Taylor – harmonica (8)
 Rosemary Butler – backing vocals
 Arnold McCuller – backing vocals
 Lani Groves – additional backing vocals (1, 6, 10)
 David Lasley – additional backing vocals (1, 6, 10)

Production 
 Producer – Don Grolnick 
 Production Coordinator – Peter Stiglin
 Recorded and Mixed by James Farber
 Assistant Engineer – Don Rodenbach
 Recorded and Mixed at The Power Station (New York, NY).
 Guitar and Piano Technician – Edd Kolakowski 
 Digital Editing – Rhonda Schoen
 Mastered by Greg Calbi at Sterling Sound (New York, NY).
 Wolf Photos – Jim Brandenburg 
 J.T. Photos –  Rudy Molacek 
 Art Direction – Marc Balet

References

1988 albums
James Taylor albums
Columbia Records albums